Cosmo Omnibus Imagiable Illusion (subtitled Live at Pit-Inn, Tokyo, Japan, 8, 8, 1988) is a live album by jazz composer, bandleader and keyboardist Sun Ra and his Arkestra recorded in Tokyo in 1988 and released on the Japanese DIW label.

Reception
The Allmusic review by Jesse Jarnow awarded the album 3 stars stating "The recording captures the band sympathetically, managing to keep the chaos under control through a crisp and deep mix... a good introduction to Sun Ra's work".

Track listing
All compositions by Sun Ra except as indicated
" Introduction/Cosmo Approach Prelude" – 7:29   
 "Angel Race/I Wait for You" – 7:18   
 "Can You Take It?" – 3:14   
 "If You Came from Nowhere Here" – 10:27   
 "Astro Black" – 11:23   
 "Prelude to a Kiss" (Duke Ellington, Irving Gordon) – 5:11   
 "Why Was I Born?" (Oscar Hammerstein II, Jerome Kern) – 5:57   
 "Insterstellar Lo-Ways" – 7:23

Personnel
Sun Ra – piano, synthesizer, vocals
Michael Ray – trumpet, vocals on "Why Was I Born?"
Ahmed Abdullah – trumpet
Tyrone Hill – trombone
Marshall Allen – alto saxophone
John Gilmore – tenor saxophone, timbales
Danny Ray Thompson – baritone saxophone
Eloe Omoe – bass clarinet, alto saxophone, contra-alto clarinet
June Tyson – violin, vocals on "Astro Black"
Bruce Edwards – electric guitar
Rollo Radford – electric bass
Eric Walker, Earl "Buster" Smith – drums

References 

Sun Ra live albums
DIW Records live albums
1989 albums